Medicinal chemistry is a discipline involving chemistry and pharmacology.

Medicinal Chemistry may also refer to:
Clinical chemistry, area of chemistry also known as medical biochemistry
Medicinal Chemistry (Bentham Open journal), published by Bentham Open
Medicinal Chemistry (OMICS Publishing Group journal), published by OMICS Publishing Group